Paladini is a surname. Notable people with the surname include:

Arcangela Paladini (1599–1622), Italian painter, singer and poet
Daniel Paladini (born 1984), American soccer player
George dos Santos Paladini (born 1978), Brazilian soccer player
Giacomo Paladini (d. 1470), Italian Roman Catholic bishop
Gianni Paladini (born 1945), Italian football club chairman
Giovanni Domenico Paladini (1721-1772), Italian painter
Riccardo Paladini (1879–1943), Italian admiral